Neapoli Stadium is a football stadium in Nikaia, Piraeus, Attica.

The stadium was completed in 1965, and currently has a seating capacity of about 6,000.

The stadium is mostly used for football matches and is the home field for Ionikos F.C.

Record attendance is 6,565 for a match against Olympiacos F.C. in 1990.
On June 13, 2009, it was also used as the field for the Rugby Sevens' finals of the Hellenic Rugby Federation.

Members Club

While Ionikos was competing in the lower divisions there were two main supporters' groups—the Association of Ionikos Nikaias Supporters and the Fan Club of Agios Georgios.

References

External links
 Neapoli Stadium profile at Stadia.gr
 http://hellenicrugbynews.blogspot.com/2009/06/blog-post.html
 http://hellenicrugbynews.blogspot.com/2009/06/blog-post_22.html

1965 establishments in Greece
Football venues in Greece
Sports venues in Piraeus
Multi-purpose stadiums in Greece
Nikaia-Agios Ioannis Rentis
Ionikos F.C.